Zobeide may refer to:
 The Story of Zobeide, miracle in One Thousand and One Nights
 Zobeide, Martinique
 Zobeide, character in the opera Abu Hassan

See also 
 Zubaida (name)